Richard Vogel (born 13 August 1964) is a former professional tennis player from the Czech Republic who competed for Czechoslovakia.

Career
Vogel played in the singles draw of two Grand Slams during his career and lost five set matches in both opening rounds, at the 1989 French Open (to Aaron Krickstein) and the 1991 Wimbledon Championships (to Jacco Eltingh). His loss to Eltingh set a Wimbledon record, as it was the first occasion that four tie breaks had been played in a single match. As a men's doubles player he was also unable to make it past the first round, in four attempts.

On the ATP Tour he had his best result in 1992, at the Croatia Open, where he was the doubles champion, with David Prinosil. His best singles performance came at Kitzbühel in 1991, with an appearance in the round of 16, after two wins, one of which was over Cédric Pioline.

He partnered Branislav Stankovič at the 1987 Summer Universiade and the pair won the gold medal.

ATP Career finals

Doubles: 1 (1–0)

Challenger titles

Singles: (1)

Doubles: (9)

References

1964 births
Living people
Czechoslovak male tennis players
Czech male tennis players
Sportspeople from Ostrava
Universiade medalists in tennis
Universiade gold medalists for Czechoslovakia
Medalists at the 1987 Summer Universiade
Friendship Games medalists in tennis